P.R.G Arunkumar is an Indian politician. He is a member of the All India Anna Dravida Munnetra Kazhagam party. He was elected as a member of Tamil Nadu Legislative Assembly from Kavundampalayam Constituency in May 2021. He is the Coimbatore Suburban North District Organization Secretary of AIADMK. Previoulsy he won in Coimbatore North constituency in the fifteenth legislative assembly.

Electoral performance

References 

Living people
People from Tamil Nadu
Tamil Nadu politicians
All India Anna Dravida Munnetra Kazhagam politicians
Tamil Nadu MLAs 2021–2026
Tamil Nadu MLAs 2016–2021
1992 births